Yuriy Yuriy-Yosypovych Shulyatytskyi (born 11 August 1970) is a Ukrainian retired professional footballer who played as a right winger.

Personal life
Shulyatytskyi is married and has two daughters. His is the son of Ukrainian football manager Yuriy-Yosyp Shulyatytskyi.

Honours

Karpaty Lviv
 Ukrainian Cup runner-up: 1992–93

References

External links
 
 

1970 births
Living people
Sportspeople from Ivano-Frankivsk
Soviet footballers
Ukrainian footballers
Association football forwards
FC Spartak Ivano-Frankivsk players
FC SKA-Karpaty Lviv players
FC Halychyna Drohobych players
FC Metalist Kharkiv players
FC Karpaty Lviv players
FC Khutrovyk Tysmenytsia players
FC Skala Stryi (1911) players
FC Naftovyk-Ukrnafta Okhtyrka players
FC Zirka Kropyvnytskyi players
FC Volyn Lutsk players
Dinaburg FC players
FC Tekhno-Centre Rohatyn players
FC Kalush players
FC Prykarpattia Ivano-Frankivsk (1998) players
Soviet Top League players
Soviet First League players
Soviet Second League players
Ukrainian Premier League players
Ukrainian First League players
Ukrainian Second League players
Ukrainian Amateur Football Championship players
Latvian Higher League players
Ukrainian expatriate footballers
Expatriate footballers in Latvia
Ukrainian expatriate sportspeople in Latvia